XEOR-AM (branded as 	Notigape 1390 AM) is a Spanish news/talk radio station that serves the McAllen, Texas (USA) / Reynosa, Tamaulipas (Mexico) border area.

History
XEOR-AM received its concession on November 4, 1949.

External links

 raiostationworld.com; Radio stations serving the Rio Grande Valley

References

1949 establishments in Mexico
News and talk radio stations in Mexico
Radio stations established in 1949
Radio stations in Reynosa
Spanish-language radio stations